Dystrichothorax montiscoerulei is a species of ground beetle in the subfamily Psydrinae. It was described by Baehr in 2006.

References

montiscoerulei
Beetles described in 2006